Finne may refer to:

People
 Bård Finne
 Ewa Thalén Finné (born 1959), Swedish Moderate Party politician
 Ferdinand Finne (1910–1999), Norwegian artist
 Finne Jager, also known as Phynn (born 1984), Dutch disc jockey
 Gabriel Finne (1866–1899), Norwegian writer
 Geir Finne (1948–2020), Norwegian politician
 Gunnar Finne
 Hans Finne-Grønn (1903–2001), Norwegian painter
 Julie Finne-Ipsen, Danish golf player
 Jørgen Finne-Grønn (1905–1998), Norwegian diplomat
 Severin Finne (1883–1953), Norwegian fencer
 Stian Herlofsen Finne-Grønn (1869–1963), Norwegian lawyer, archivist, genealogist and museum director

Places
 Baile na Finne or Fintown, Ireland
 Finne, Saxony-Anhalt, Germany
 Finne (hills), Germany
 Loch Finne or Lough Finn, Ireland
 Loch Bó Finne or Lough Bofin (Galway), Ireland

See also
 Finns